Clemens Jonas (born 12 November 1980) is an Austrian former competitive figure skater. A four-time national champion (1999, 2001–02, 2004), he represented Austria at five European and four World Championships.

Career 
In November 1998, Jonas qualified for the short program at the World Junior Championships in Zagreb, Croatia but did not advance further. After winning his first national title, he was sent to the European Championships, held in Prague, Czech Republic in January 1999, but was eliminated in the qualifying round. 

Jonas sustained a serious injury in a car accident in August 2002 and resumed training in mid-October. In January 2003, he qualified for the free skate at the European Championships in Malmö, Sweden, and finished 22nd overall, his highest ISU Championship placement. Jonas had knee surgery in April 2003, keeping him off the ice for four months. 

In the 2003–04 season, Jonas won his fourth national title. He retired from competition following the 2004 World Championships in Dortmund, Germany.

Programs

Competitive highlights

References

External links
 

1980 births
Austrian male single skaters
Living people
Figure skaters from Vienna